Bayshore is a station on the transitway in Ottawa, Ontario,  served by OC Transpo buses. It is located in the western transitway section at the Bayshore Shopping Centre in the neighbourhood of Bayshore.

Prior to its construction, buses used Woodridge Crescent and entered the shopping centre parking lot, which is prone to congestion and extensive delays. Due to no access to westbound Woodridge Crescent from Bayshore Drive northbound (except emergency vehicles), routes 11, 82, 57, and 173 have to travel around the shopping centre, on Richmond Road and Holly Acres Road, to enter the small bus-route access to the station. Eastbound trips of routes 11, 82, 57, and 173 travel on Woodridge Crescent eastbound, then on Bayshore Drive southbound, and then their regular route from Richmond Road onward.

A second platform allowed rapid routes 61, 62, and 63 to pass through the station via a transitway segment between Pinecrest station and Moodie station, which was originally built in 2009 and later extended towards Moodie in 2017. 

On April 24, 2022 the transitway was closed for construction of the Stage 2 O-Train extension.  In addition, the buildings and pedestrian overpass to Bayshore Shopping Centre were closed for construction. It is expected to be completed in early 2024.

Service

The following routes serve Bayshore station as of February 19 2023:

References

External links
 OC Transpo station page
 OC Transpo Area Map

2000 establishments in Ontario
Railway stations scheduled to open in 2026
Transitway (Ottawa) stations